Andrei Alekseyevich Popov (12 April 1918 – 14 June 1983) was a Soviet and Russian stage and film actor, theatre director and pedagogue. People's Artist of the USSR (1965).

Biography
His father, Aleksey Popov, was the director of the Red Army Theatre. Young Popov made his film debut in 1930, as a schoolboy in Russian silent film Large Nuisance; that film was eventually lost or destroyed during the turbulent history of the Soviet Union.

Between 1935 and 1939 Popov studied acting at the Drama Studio of the Red Army Theatre in Moscow. Until 1974 he was a permanent member of the troupe at the Central Theatre of the Soviet Army (formerly known as the Red Army Theatre).

During World War II, Andrei Popov entertained soldiers at the front-lines. After his father's retirement in 1963, Andrei Popov succeeded him as the artistic director of the Soviet Army Theatre.

In 1974, Popov was invited to join the Moscow Art Theatre. There he co-starred in several stage productions together with such partners as Smoktunovsky, Yefremov, Tabakov, and other stars of Russian theater. He appeared in more than 40 films between 1947 and 1981.

Andrei Popov was designated a People's Artist of the USSR and also received the Stalin Prize. From 1960s to 1982 he taught acting at Russian Institute of Theatre Arts.

Selected filmography

 Mussorgsky (1950) as Nikolai Rimsky-Korsakov
 The Unforgettable Year 1919 (1951) as Nikolay Nekhyudov
 The Composer Glinka (1952) as Vladimir Stasov
 Hostile Whirlwinds (1953) as R. H. Bruce Lockhart
 The Safety Match (1954) as Detective Emil Dyukovsky
 The Road (1955) as Professor Sergey Baytalin
 Othello (1955) as Iago
 Gutta-percha Boy (1957) as Count Sergey
 Gentle (1960) as Pawnbroker
 The Taming of the Shrew (1962) as Petruchio
 All Remains to People (1963) as Serafim Nikolayevich
 Hamlet (1964) as episode
 In S. City (1966) as Chekhov
 The Seventh Companion (1968) as Maj. Gen. Adamov
 Day Stars (1968) as Olga Bergholz's father
 Szerelmi álmok - Liszt (1970) as Franz Liszt (voice)
 Taming of the Fire (1972) as Nikolay Logunov
 Step Forward (1976) as Captain
 A Few Days from the Life of I. I. Oblomov (1980) as Zakhar

Honors and awards 

 Honored Artist of the RSFSR (1954)
 People's Artist of the RSFSR (1959)
 People's Artist of the USSR (1965)
 Stalin Prize (1950)
 Order of the Red Banner of Labour (1967)
 Order of the October Revolution (1978)

References

External links

1918 births
1983 deaths
20th-century Russian male actors
People from Kostroma
Honored Artists of the RSFSR
People's Artists of the RSFSR
People's Artists of the USSR
Stalin Prize winners
Recipients of the Order of the Red Banner of Labour
Soviet drama teachers
Soviet male film actors
Soviet male stage actors
Soviet male voice actors
Soviet theatre directors
Spoken word artists
Burials at Vvedenskoye Cemetery